Princess Marina may refer to: 

Princess Marina Petrovna of Russia (1892–1981), daughter of Grand Duke Peter Nikolaevich of Russia and Grand Duchess Militza
Princess Marina of Greece and Denmark (1906–1968), wife of Prince George, Duke of Kent, son of George V and Queen Mary
Marina, Princess of Naples (born 1935), wife of Vittorio Emanuele, Prince of Naples
Marina Karella, Consort of Prince Michael of Greece and Denmark (born 1940), wife of Prince Michael of Greece and Denmark
Princess Marina Hospital,  the hospital located in the capital city of Botswana, Gaborone.